The 2023 Overwatch World Cup (OWWC) will be the fifth edition of the Overwatch World Cup, an Overwatch esports tournament, organized by the game's developer Blizzard Entertainment. Over 40 teams from various countries and regions will compete for one of the 16 spots in the 2023 OWWC. It will be the first OWWC since 2019.

Teams

Committees and players 
Each country has a National Competition Committee, consisting of a general manager, head coach, and social lead, who are responsible for organizing tryouts for their country. Blizzard will choose committees via an application process, which began in February 2023. Throughout three weekends in February, every committee hosted an open format tournament, called World Cup Trials. The winning team of each World Cup Trial won  and earned an automatic invitation to their country's team tryouts in March 2023. Committees will also finalize a seven-person roster by April 2023.

Qualification 

A total of 36 countries and regions were invited, based on Overwatch 2 player population data, to play in online qualifiers for the 2023 OWWC, with the teams evenly divided into six regions. An additional four teams will also play in the online qualifiers via a "wild card challenge". Of the teams, a total of 15 will advance to the group stage of the OWWC. China received a direct invitation to the group stage due to "the current dynamics in China".

Automatically qualified (1)

Invited to qualifiers (36)

Invited to Wild Card Challenge (6)

Online qualifiers

Americas 

Group A

Group B

Europe and Middle East 

Group A

Group B

Asia-Pacific 

Group A

Group B

Group stage 
The group stage will begin in June 2023 and will be a LAN event. A total of 16 teams, determined from the online qualifiers, will be divided into groups, and each group will compete in a round-robin tournament. Of the 16 teams, eight will advance to the knockouts.

Knockout stage 
The knockout stage will consist of the top eight teams from the group stage. Teams will compete in a single-elimination tournament.

Bracket

References

External links 
 Official website

Overwatch
Overwatch World Cup